Victor Montagliani (born September 12, 1965) is a Canadian businessman, soccer executive, and the president of CONCACAF. He is a vice president of the FIFA Council.

Biography
He is a former player of amateur soccer club side Columbus F.C. In his professional career, he was a manager at Hogan & Cox Insurance Adjusters in Maple Ridge before being transferred to Vancouver in 2003. He attended Simon Fraser University.

He was the president of the  British Columbia Soccer Association in 2005. During his time at BC SA, he was supportive of Sikh players wearing a patka should they want to, after a match official has told a 17 year old player to remove it or leave the game.

He was voted in as president of the Canadian Soccer Association in May 2012. In February 2016, he announced his intention to become the President of CONCACAF. He won the presidency on May 12, 2016, defeating Larry Mussenden of Bermuda.

References

1965 births
Canadian people of Italian descent
Living people
Presidents of CONCACAF
Presidents of the Canadian Soccer Association
Association football executives
Vancouver Columbus players
Canadian soccer players
Association footballers not categorized by position